Ferny Grove State High School is a public secondary school in the suburb of Ferny Grove, in Brisbane, Australia.

The school has a total enrolment of more than 1900 students, with an official count of 1963 students in 2021. In 2007, the school won the award for the most innovative music program in Queensland. Ferny Grove has also won the award for the cleanest school for 8 years, With the latest Green and Healthy Schools award being won in 2010.

History 

The school was opened in 1980 on its current site at McGinn Road, Ferny Grove, near the Ferny Grove Railway Station and primary school; the Primary school is located in Finvoy Street Ferny Grove.

Principals 
 Keith Tabulo (1980–1982)
 Tony Marsland (1982–1985)
 Ralph Took (1985–2000)
 Russell Burguez (Acting) (2000)
 Chris Rider (2000–2007)
 Kaye Gardner (2007–2010)
 David Sutton (Acting) (2010)
 Mark Breckenridge (2010–2017)
 John Schuh (2018–2021)
 Joseba Larrazabal (Acting) (2021)
 Janelle Amos (Acting) (2021)
 Kiah Lanham (Acting) (2022–Present)

Teachers 

Notable teachers at the school include John Howard Amundsen who taught the subjects of manual arts, media and business. Amundsen gained notoriety in May 2006, after a stockpile of explosives and detonators were found in his home which caused the school to be evacuated and searched. On 10 May 2006, the school was closed for most of the morning as police with sniffer dogs checked classrooms, before they declared it safe for students and staff to resume lessons. In a Brisbane court on 11 May 2006, he was charged with fraudulently obtaining 53kg of the explosive substance Powergel. He was subsequently charged with preparing a terrorist act, as well as two counts of making a threat and making a hoax threat. In February 2007, the charges of terrorism and making a hoax threat were dropped but replaced with new charges of possessing incendiary devices and having dangerous goods in a vehicle.

Campus

Location 

The school is located in the suburb of Ferny Grove in Queensland's capital city, Brisbane. It is situated on McGinn Road, which is quite close to Ferny Grove State Primary School and the Ferny Grove Railway Station.

Grounds and facilities 

The grounds of the school are known for their landscaping and aesthetically pleasing gardens. The school occupies a large area of land, and this allows the school have a feel of space, openness and tranquility. There is only one building that is not single story, and this demonstrates the contrast of Ferny Grove SHS from the typical hospital-style campuses of other Brisbane Secondary Schools such as St Lawrence's and Brisbane State High.

 3-storey learning excellence centre
 Sports and performing arts centre  
 Hall (including a futsal and volleyball court)
 300 seat Auditorium with rehearsal rooms, foyer and amenities
 4 tennis courts and 4 basketball/netball courts
 Air-conditioned library
 Gymnasium
 Oval (400m turfed athletics track included)
 Football field
 Rugby league/rugby union field
 School Farm
 Woodwork and Metalwork workshops
 Horticultural precinct
 Separate faculty blocks
 Performing Arts rooms

Uniform

Male 
The summer uniform consists of mint green buttoned shirt, bottle green shorts, brown leather belt, brown leather shoes, brown socks and an optional bottle green tie. The winter uniform is the same, with the inclusion of a dark green sweater with school emblem or school jacket. For formal occasions and senior leaders, a blazer is worn, with school emblem and appropriate gold insignia.

Female 

Bottle green skirt and pale green blouse with Brown Leather lace up Shoes and brown socks a Tie can be worn but it is not compulsory.

School houses 

On enrolment, students are allocated at random to the four houses of Itchika (red), Kara Kara (yellow), Ourapilla (black), and Wookarin (blue). The houses take their names from the language of the original indigenous inhabitants of the land on which the school is situated.

Alumni 

Andrew Letherby, long-distance runner. Bronze medallist at the 2002 Commonwealth Games.
Anthony Lister, artist.
 Barry Berrigan, rugby league player.
 Jharal Yow Yeh, rugby league player. Represented Queensland and Australia. 
Julia Robinson, NRLW player
Justin Hodges, rugby league player. Represented Queensland and Australia. Won premierships in 2002 and 2006. Captain of the Brisbane Broncos from 2014-15. Dally M Centre of the Year in 2007. 
 Lisa and Jessica Origliasso of The Veronicas. The sisters sang together in the 1998 Ferny High school talent quest and placed second.
 Lochlan Watt
 Melina Vidler, actress. Won Most Outstanding Newcomer – Actress at the 2016 Logie Awards. 
 Remy Hii, actor. Won Most Outstanding Newcomer at the 2014 Logie Awards. 
 Rohan Bail, Australian rules footballer. 
 Ryan Williams, former German teacher at the school before leaving to pursue a medical career. Winner of the TJ Ryan award.
 Sharon Cripps, sprinter. Gold medallist at the 1998 Commonwealth Games. Competed at the 1996 and 2000 Olympics. 
Shaun Berrigan, rugby league player. Represented Queensland and Australia. Won premierships in 2000 and 2006. Clive Churchill medallist in 2006. 
Stephen Eaton, OAM, athlete. Gold medallist at the 2000 Summer Paralympics.
Tamara Nowitzki, swimmer. Silver medallist at the 2000 Summer Paralympics.

Notes and references

External links 
 Official School Webpage

Public high schools in Brisbane
Rock Eisteddfod Challenge participants
Educational institutions established in 1980
1980 establishments in Australia